Hurtigheim is a commune in the Bas-Rhin department in Grand Est in north-eastern France.

Hurtigheim has been built along an old Roman road leading from Strasbourg to Saverne.

Notable people
Jean-Jacques Urban, a prominent politician of the Democratic Republican Alliance in the 1930s and 1940s, was born at Hurtigheim on 26 October 1875.   The party emerged discredited from the Vichy period, but Urban himself did not participate in the voting of full powers to Philippe Pétain in July 1940.

See also
 Communes of the Bas-Rhin department
 Kochersberg

References

Communes of Bas-Rhin
Bas-Rhin communes articles needing translation from French Wikipedia